Adam Cichon (born 20 October 1975 in Poland) is a German retired footballer.

Career

After failing to make an appearance for German Bundesliga side Köln, Cichon signed for SC Fortuna Köln in the second division. Despite being relegated with SC Fortuna Köln to the third and fourth divisions, he signed for Polish top flight club Widzew Łódź amid offers from the German second division. However, Cichon was criticized by fans as well as journalists upon arrival and never established himself as a starter for the team.

In 2008, after playing for another Polish top flight outfit, Polonia Warsaw, he signed for Gratkorn in the Austrian lower leagues.

References

External links
 Adam Cichon at 90minut

German footballers
Association football midfielders
Living people
1975 births
SC Fortuna Köln players
Widzew Łódź players
Polonia Warsaw players
People from Lubliniec
German people of Polish descent